Eleni Zaroulia (born 21 May 1961) is a Greek convicted criminal  and former politician of the Golden Dawn. She was first elected to parliament during the June 2012 Greek legislative election.

Political involvements
On 1 October 2012, Zaroulia joined the Committee on Equality and Non-Discrimination of the Parliamentary Assembly of the Council of Europe. The Anti-Defamation League described this as "an affront to concepts of equality and non-discrimination".

Personal life
She is the wife of Golden Dawn leader Nikolaos Michaloliakos. Their daughter Ourania was one of six people arrested during a motorcycle attack against immigrants; all six were later released.

References

1961 births
Living people
Golden Dawn (political party) politicians
Greek MPs 2012–2014
Greek MPs 2015 (February–August)
Greek MPs 2015–2019
Politicians from Athens